Rooter or Rooters may refer to:

 Rooter: A Methodology for the Typical Unification of Access Points and Redundancy, a nonsense computer science research paper
 Rooter (Ender's Game), a fictional character
 Royal Rooters, fan club for the Boston Americans
 Cumberland Rooters, minor league baseball club in the Western Pennsylvania League

See also
 Rooster (disambiguation)
 Root (disambiguation)
 Rooting (disambiguation)